S. Sathiamoorthy was an Indian politician and former Member of the Legislative Assembly of Tamil Nadu. He was elected to the Tamil Nadu legislative assembly as an Anna Dravida Munnetra Kazhagam candidate from Kadaladi constituency in  1980 election.

References 

All India Anna Dravida Munnetra Kazhagam politicians
Possibly living people
Year of birth missing
Place of birth missing